The sixth season of the reality television series Love & Hip Hop: New York aired on VH1 from December 14, 2015 until March 28, 2016. The show was primarily filmed in New York City, New York. It was executively produced by Mona Scott-Young and Stephanie R. Gayle for Monami Entertainment, Toby Barraud, Stefan Springman, Mala Chapple, David DiGangi, and Ian Gelfand for Eastern TV, and Susan Levison, Nina L. Diaz, Ken Martinez and Vivian Gomez for VH1.

The series chronicles the lives of several women and men in the New York area, involved in hip hop music. It consists of 14 episodes, including a two-part reunion special hosted by Nina Parker.

Production
On July 7, 2015, shortly after her release from prison, Remy Ma announced that she was joining the show for season six, along with her husband Papoose. On November 2, 2015, VH1 announced that Love & Hip Hop would be returning for a sixth season on December 14, 2015. A 5-minute "super-trailer" was released on November 30, 2015. 

The cast would undergo a major cast change for the third time in the show's history, with only Yandy, Tara and Amina returning from last season's main cast. They were joined by Remy, social media personality Cardi B and up-and-coming rappers Mariahlynn and Miss Moe Money and Sexy Lexxy of the rap duo BBOD. The season's storylines focused more on the struggles of female rappers in the industry than ever before. Papoose would appear as a supporting cast member, along with radio personality DJ Self, his girlfriend Yorma Hernandez, and rapper Bianca Bonnie. Rose, a stylist who has an affair with Self, appeared in a minor supporting role.

Synopsis

Cast

Starring

 Yandy Smith-Harris (13 episodes)
 Tara Wallace (10 episodes)
 Cardi B (13 episodes)
 Amina Buddafly (10 episodes)
 Miss Moe Money (13 episodes)
 Sexxy Lexxy (12 episodes)
 Mariahlynn (13 episodes)
 Remy Ma (11 episodes)

Also starring

 Rah Ali (14 episodes)
 Papoose (9 episodes)
 Mendeecees Harris (7 episodes)
 Peter Gunz (13 episodes)
 Bianca Bonnie (10 episodes)
 DJ Self (12 episodes)
 Rich Dollaz (11 episodes)
 Yorma Hernandez (8 episodes)
 Cisco Rosado (8 episodes)
 Rose (6 episodes)

Ashley Trowers, Miracle Kaye Hall, Jace Smith, Dejay Mackie, Jazz Schmahl, Tasha Araujo-Jacoby, Whitney Pankey, Talia Coles, Irene Mackie, Hennessy Carolina, Maddie Smith, Judy Harris, Erika DeShazo, Samantha Wallace, Kim Wallace, Raemonique Smith and Remeesha Smith appear as guest stars. Jazz Schmahl appear in an episode. The show also features minor appearances from notable figures within the hip hop industry and New York's social scene, including Quavo and Takeoff of Migos, Treach, Dr. Jeff, French Montana, Cam'ron, Maino, HoodCelebrityy, Fat Joe, Ice-T, Coco Austin and Keyshia Cole.

The show features cameo appearances from the cast's children, including Mendeeces's children Lil Mendeecees, Aasim, Omere and Skylar Harris. Juju C. appears in an uncredited cameo appearance, she would join the supporting cast in season seven.

Episodes

Music
Several cast members had their music featured on the show and released singles to coincide with the airing of the episodes.

References

External links

2015 American television seasons
2016 American television seasons
Love & Hip Hop